Ancona (also) is a city and a seaport in the Marche region in central Italy, with a population of around 101,997 . Ancona is the capital of the province of Ancona and of the region.

Ancona is one of the main ports on the Adriatic Sea, especially for passenger traffic, and is the main economic and demographic centre of the region.

History

Greek colony
Ancona was populated as a region by Picentes since the 6th century BC who also developed  a small town there.

Ancona took a more urban shape by Greek settlers from Syracuse in about 387 BC, who gave it its name: Ancona stems from the Greek word  (Ankṓn), meaning "elbow"; the harbour to the east of the town was originally protected only by the promontory on the north, shaped like an elbow. Greek merchants established a Tyrian purple dye factory here. In Roman times it kept its own coinage with the punning device of the bent arm holding a palm branch, and the head of Aphrodite on the reverse, and continued the use of the Greek language.

Roman Municipum
When it became a Roman town is uncertain. It was occupied as a naval station in the Illyrian War of 178 BC.  Julius Caesar took possession of it immediately after crossing the Rubicon. Its harbour was of considerable importance in imperial times, as the nearest to Dalmatia, and was enlarged by Trajan, who constructed the north quay with his architect Apollodorus of Damascus. At the beginning of it stands the marble triumphal arch, the Arch of Trajan with a single archway, and without bas-reliefs, erected in his honour in 115 by the Senate and Roman people.

Byzantine City 

Ancona was attacked successively by the Goths and Lombards between the 3rd and 5th centuries, but recovered its strength and importance. It was one of the cities of the Pentapolis of the Exarchate of Ravenna, a lordship of the Byzantine Empire, in the 7th and 8th centuries. In 840, Saracen raiders sacked and burned the city. After Charlemagne's conquest of northern Italy, it became the capital of the Marca di Ancona, whence the name of the modern region derives.

Maritime Republic of Ancona

After 1000, Ancona became increasingly independent, eventually turning into an important maritime republic (together with Gaeta and Ragusa, it is one of those not appearing on the Italian naval flag), often clashing against the nearby power of Venice. An oligarchic republic, Ancona was ruled by six Elders, elected by the three terzieri into which the city was divided: S. Pietro, Porto and Capodimonte. It had a coin of its own, the agontano, and a series of laws known as Statuti del mare e del Terzenale and Statuti della Dogana. Ancona was usually allied with the Republic of Ragusa and the Byzantine Empire.

In 1137, 1167 and 1174 it was strong enough to push back the forces of the Holy Roman Empire. Anconitan ships took part in the Crusades, and their navigators included Cyriac of Ancona. In the struggle between the Popes and the Holy Roman Emperors that troubled Italy from the 12th century onwards, Ancona sided with the Guelphs.

Unlike other cities of northern Italy, Ancona never became a signoria. The sole exception was the rule of the Malatesta, who took the city in 1348, taking advantage of the black death and of a fire that had destroyed many of the city's important buildings. The Malatesta were ousted in 1383. In 1532 Ancona definitively lost its freedom and became part of the Papal States, under Pope Clement VII. The symbol of the new papal authority was the massive Citadel.

In the Papal States
Together with Rome and Avignon in southern France, Ancona was one of three cities in the Papal States in which the Jews were allowed to stay after 1569, living in the ghetto built after 1555.

In 1733, Pope Clement XII extended the quay, and an inferior imitation of Trajan's arch was set up; he also erected a Lazaretto at the south end of the harbour, Luigi Vanvitelli being the architect-in-chief. The southern quay was built in 1880, and the harbour was protected by forts on the heights. From 1797 onwards, when the French took it, it frequently appears in history as an important fortress.

The Greek community of Ancona

Ancona, as well as Venice, became a very important destination for merchants from the Ottoman Empire during the 16th century. The Greeks formed the largest of the communities of foreign merchants. They were refugees from former Byzantine or Venetian territories that were occupied by the Ottomans in the late 15th and 16th centuries. The first Greek community was established in Ancona early in the 16th century.

Contemporary history
Ancona entered the Kingdom of Italy when Christophe Léon Louis Juchault de Lamoricière surrendered here on 29 September 1860, eleven days after his defeat at Castelfidardo.

On 23 May 1915, Italy entered World War I and joined the Entente Powers. In 1915, following Italy's entry, the battleship division of the Austro-Hungarian Navy carried out extensive bombardments causing great damage to all installations and killing several dozen people. Ancona was one of the most important Italian ports on the Adriatic Sea during the Great War.
 
During World War II, the city was taken by the Polish 2nd Corps against Nazi German forces, as Free Polish forces were serving as part of the British Army. Poles were tasked with capture of the city on 16 June 1944 and accomplished the task a month later on 18 July 1944 in what is known as the battle of Ancona. The attack was part of an Allied operation to gain access to a seaport closer to the Gothic Line in order to shorten their lines of communication for the advance into northern Italy.

Jewish history 

Jews began to live in Ancona in 967 A.D. It has been claimed that in 1270, a Jewish resident of Ancona, Jacob of Ancona, travelled to China, four years before Marco Polo, and documented his impressions in a book called "The City of Lights". From 1300 and on, the Jewish community of Ancona grew steadily, most due to the city importance and it being a center of trade with the Levant. In that year, Jewish poet Immanuel the Roman tried to lower high taxation taken from the Jewish community of the city. Over the next 200 years, Jews from Germany, Spain, Sicily and Portugal immigrated to Ancona, due to persecutions in their homeland and thanks to the pro-Jewish attitude taken towards Ancona Jews due to their importance in the trade and banking business, making Ancona a trade center. In 1550, the Jewish population of Ancona numbered about 2700 individuals.

In 1555, pope Paul IV forced the Crypto-Jewish community of the city to convert to Christianity, as part of his Papal Bull of 1555. While some did, others refused to do so and thus were hanged and then burnt in the town square. In response, Jewish merchants boycotted Ancona for a short while. The boycott was led by Dona Gracia Mendes Nasi.

Though emancipated by Napoleon I for several years, in 1843 Pope Gregory XVI revived an old decree, forbidding Jews from living outside the ghetto, wearing identification sign on their clothes and other religious and financial restrictions. Public opinion did not approve of these restrictions, and they were cancelled a short while after.

The Jews of Ancona received full emancipation in 1848 with the election of Pope Pius IX.  In 1938, 1177 lived in Ancona; 53 Jews were sent away to Germany, 15 of them survived and returned to the town after World War II. The majority of the Jewish community stayed in town or emigrated due to high ransoms paid to the fascist regime. In 2004, about 200 Jews lived in Ancona.

Two synagogues and two cemeteries still exist in the city. The ancient Monte-Cardeto cemetery is one of the biggest Jewish cemeteries in Europe and tombstones are dated to 1552 and on. It can still be visited and it resides within the Parco del Cardeto.

Geography

Climate 
The climate of Ancona is humid subtropical (Cfa in the Köppen climate classification) and the city lies on the border between mediterranean and more continental regions. Precipitations are regular throughout the year. Winters are cool (January mean temp. ), with frequent rain and fog. Temperatures can reach  or even lower values outside the city centre during the most intense cold waves. Snow is not unusual with air masses coming from Northern Europe or from the Balkans and Russia, and can be heavy at times (also due to the "Adriatic sea effect"), especially in the hills surrounding the city centre. Summers are usually warm and humid (July mean temp. ). Thunderstorms are quite common, particularly in August and September, and can be intense with occasional flash floods, damaging winds and even large hail. Spring and autumn are both seasons with changeable weather, but generally mild.

Demographics

In 2007, there were 101,480 people residing in Ancona (the greater area has a population more than four times its size), located in the province of Ancona, Marches, of whom 47.6% were male and 52.4% were female. Minors (children ages 18 and younger) totalled 15.54 percent of the population compared to pensioners who number 24.06 percent. This compares with the Italian average of 18.06 percent (minors) and 19.94 percent (pensioners). The average age of Ancona residents is 48, compared to the Italian average of 42. In the five years between 2002 and 2007, the population of Ancona grew by 1.48 percent, while Italy as a whole grew by 3.56 percent. The current birth rate of Ancona is 8.14 births per 1,000 inhabitants compared to the Italian average of 9.45 births.

, 92.77% of the population was Italian. The largest immigrant group came from other European nations (particularly those from Albania, Romania and Ukraine): 3.14%, followed by the Americas: 0.93%, East Asia: 0.83%, and North Africa: 0.80%.

Ancona is also home to a dialect of the Emilian-Romagnol language known as Gallo-Picene, separate from one spoken in the Province of Pesaro and Urbino.

Government

Main sights

Ancona Cathedral

Ancona Cathedral, dedicated to Judas Cyriacus, was consecrated at the beginning of the 11th century and completed in 1189. Some writers suppose that the original church was in the form of a basilica and belonged to the 7th century. An early restoration was completed in 1234. It is a fine Romanesque building in grey stone, built in the form of a Greek cross, and other elements of Byzantine art. It has a dodecagonal dome over the centre slightly altered by Margaritone d'Arezzo in 1270. The façade has a Gothic portal, ascribed to Giorgio da Como (1228), which was intended to have a lateral arch on each side. The interior, which has a crypt under each transept, in the main preserves its original character. It has ten columns which are attributed to the temple of Venus. The church was restored in the 1980s.

Arch of Trajan

It was built in the year 114/115 as an entrance to the causeway atop the harbour wall and is named in honour of Trajan, the emperor who made the harbour. Most of its original bronze ornaments have disappeared. The archway is flanked by pairs of fluted Corinthian columns on pedestals. A pediment bears inscriptions. The format is that of the Arch of Titus in Rome, but made taller, so that the bronze figures surmounting it, of Trajan, his wife Plotina and sister Marciana, would figure as a landmark for ships approaching Rome's greatest Adriatic port.

Other sights
Later it was used also as a military hospital or as barracks; it is currently used for cultural exhibits.
The Episcopal Palace was the place where Pope Pius II died in 1464.
Santa Maria della Piazza: medieval romanesque church with an elaborate arcaded façade (1210).
Palazzo del Comune (or Palazzo degli Anziani – Elders palace); it was built in 1250, with lofty arched substructures at the back, was gotic work of Margaritone d'Arezzo.
the Palazzo del Governo (now prefecture), Renaissance work of Francesco di Giorgio Martini.
Santi Pellegrino e Teresa: 18th century church.
Santissimo Sacramento: 16th and 18th century church.

There are also several buildings by Giorgio da Sebenico, combining Gothic and Renaissance elements: the Palazzo Benincasa, the Loggia dei Mercanti, the Franciscan church of San Francesco alle Scale and Sant'Agostino, Augustinian church with statues portraying St. Monica, St. Nicola da Tolentino, St. Simplicianus and Blessed Agostino Trionfi; in the 18th century it was enlarged by Luigi Vanvitelli and turned into a palace after 1860.

The National Archaeological Museum of the Marche Region is housed in the Palazzo Ferretti, built in the late Renaissance by Pellegrino Tibaldi; it preserves frescoes by Federico Zuccari. The Museum is divided into several sections:
 prehistoric section, with palaeolithic and neolithic artefacts, objects of the Copper Age and of the Bronze Age
 protohistoric section, with the richest existing collection of the Picenian civilization; the section includes a remarkable collection of Greek ceramics
 Greek-Hellenistic section, with coins, inscriptions, glassware and other objects from the necropolis of Ancona
 Roman section, with a statue of Augustus, Pontifex Maximus, carved sarcophagi and two Roman beds with fine decorations in ivory
 rich collection of ancient coins (not yet exposed)

The Municipal Art Gallery (Pinacoteca Civica Francesco Podesti) is housed in the Palazzo Bosdari, reconstructed between 1558 and 1561 by Pellegrino Tibaldi. Works in the gallery include:

Circumcision, Dormitio Virginis and Crowned Virgin, by Olivuccio di Ciccarello
Madonna with Child, panel by Carlo Crivelli
Gozzi Altarpiece by Titian
Sacra Conversazione by Lorenzo Lotto
Portrait of Francesco Arsilli by Sebastiano Del Piombo
Circumcision by Orazio Gentileschi
Immaculate Conception and St. Palazia by Guercino
Four Saints in Ecstasis, Panorama of Ancona in the sixteenth century and Musician Angels by Andrea Lillio

Other artists present include Francesco Podesti, Ciro Ferri and Arcangelo di Cola. Modern artists featured are Anselmo Bucci, Massimo Campigli, Bruno Cassinari, Enzo Cucchi, Carlo Levi, Aligi Sassu, Orfeo Tamburi and others.

People from Ancona
Cyriac of Ancona, navigator and archeologist
Franco Corelli (1921-2003), opera singer.
Jean Guillaume Bruguière, zoologist, died in Ancona in 1798
Niccolò Matas (1798–1872), Italian architect.
Virna Lisi (1936–2014), actress
Vito Volterra (1860–1940), mathematician

Transportation

Shipping
The Port has regular ferry links to the following cities with the following operators:
 Adria Ferries (Durrës)
 Jadrolinija (Split, Zadar)
 SNAV (Split) (seasonal)
 Superfast Ferries (Igoumenitsa, Patras)
 ANEK Lines (Igoumenitsa, Patras)
 Minoan Lines (Igoumenitsa, Patras)
 Marmara Lines (Çeşme)

Airport
Ancona is served by Ancona Airport (IATA: AOI, ICAO: LIPY), in Falconara Marittima and named after Raffaello Sanzio.

European Coastal Airlines, a former seaplane operator from Croatia, established trans-Adriatic flights between Croatia and Italy in November 2015, and offered four weekly flights from Ancona Falconara Airport to Split (59 minutes) and Rijeka (49 minutes).

Railways
The Ancona railway station is the main railway station of the city and is served by regional and long-distance trains. The other stations are Ancona Marittima, Ancona Torrette, Ancona Stadio, Palombina and Varano.

Roads
The A14 motorway serves the city with the exits "Ancona Nord" (An. North) and "Ancona Sud" (An. South).

Urban public transportation
The Ancona trolleybus system has been in operation since 1949. Ancona is also served by an urban and suburban bus network operated by Conerobus.

Twin towns – sister cities

Ancona is twinned with:
 Çeşme, Turkey
 Galaţi, Romania
 Split, Croatia
 Zadar, Croatia

See also
 Biblioteca comunale Luciano Benincasa
 History of A.C. Ancona
 Maritime republics
 Roman Catholic Archdiocese of Ancona-Osimo
 Stadio del Conero
 U.S. Ancona 1905
 University of Ancona

References

Sources

External links 

 

 
380s BC establishments
Cities and towns in the Marche
Coastal towns in the Marche
Duchy of the Pentapolis
Mediterranean port cities and towns in Italy
Papal States
Populated places established in the 4th century BC
Port cities and towns of the Adriatic Sea
Syracusian colonies